Joseph Nganga Maregu (born 22 November 1977) is a Kenyan long-distance runner who competes in road running events from 10K to the marathon. A journeyman competitor on the roads, he made only one international appearance at the 2008 IAAF World Half Marathon Championships, taking ninth place and a team gold medal with Kenya.

Active between 2004 and 2014, he initially focused on 10K and half marathon races and won a number of low level French competitions. His highest standard victories came at the Lille Half Marathon (2006 and 2007) and the Paris Half Marathon (2007). His lifetime best of 59:45 minutes came during his second win in Lille. He ran his first marathon in Kenya in 2006, but his debut time of 2:24:18 hours was slow. He turned to marathon running proper in 2009, taking third at the Vienna City Marathon in a time of 2:09:25 hours. This was to be his best however and in five subsequent outings he did not better two hours and ten minutes. He had his last road win in 2010 at the Olomouc Half Marathon.

International competitions

Circuit wins
Olomouc Half Marathon: 2010
Lille Half Marathon: 2006, 2007
Paris Half Marathon: 2007
15 km du Puy-en-Velay: 2007
Paris-Versailles: 2007, 2008

Personal bests
10K run – 27:43 min (2009)
Half Marathon – 59:45 min (2007)
Marathon – 2:09:25 (2009)

References

External links

Living people
1977 births
Kenyan male long-distance runners
Kenyan male marathon runners